Amelia Crowley is an Irish actress and stand-up comedian. She is known for playing Fiona Piggott on RTÉ's Fair City, Deirdre Mallon in Derry Girls, and for her theatre work in the UK and Ireland.

Career 
Crowley has made film appearances in I Went Down and Ella Enchanted.

In 2001, Crowley played Yvonn in RTÉ Two's sitcom, The Cassidys. In 2007, Crowley joined the cast of Fair City playing husband-murderer, Fiona Piggott, a love interest for Paul Brennan. She left the soap in 2011, but returned in 2020.

Filmography 

I Went Down, 1997
Ella Enchanted Fairy Administrator, 2004
Wake Wood
The Man Who Invented Christmas

Television
Finbar's Class, Lorraine, 1995
Val Falvey, TD 2005
Dublin Murders
Derry Girls, Deirdre Mallon, 2018–2022

Theatre work

F! Riverbank theatre, Dublin 1993
Twenty Grand Peacock Theatre 1998
Car Show, Car Show 2 Meeting House Square 1998-2000
The Star Trap Bewley's Café 2002
The Plough and the Stars 
Podge And Rodge Live Vicar Street 2006
Little Gem Bush Theatre 2010
The Cavalcaders Druid Theatre 2022

Personal life
Crowley is married to author and fellow actor Anthony Brophy. They have two children.

References

External links

Irish stage actresses
Irish television actresses
Irish film actresses
20th-century Irish actresses
21st-century Irish actresses
Living people
Year of birth missing (living people)
1970s births
Irish stand-up comedians
Alumni of Trinity College Dublin